On June 13, 2000, the third President of Azerbaijan--then Heydar Aliyev--issued a special order for the establishment of the National Conservatory of Azerbaijan (NCA) located in Baku, the capital of country. In accordance with this order, national artist Siyavush Karimi Ashraf was elected to the position of Rector of the Conservatory. The following year, Baku Music College and Republic Art Gymnasium were added to further expand the institution. The former and current professors of the conservatory hold expertise in various diverse backgrounds including conducting, composition, and singing. Many are professional musicians or prominent social public figures.

NCA Departments

The Department of Human Resources 
The Department of Human Resources encompasses various subsets and their duties including those of the Board of Directors, Supervisory and Audit Commission members, and their various personal affairs. There are within the authority and responsibility of the Human Resources Department.

The Department of Youth and Sport 
The Department of Youth and Sport operates for the organizing of youth leisure time via athletic activities and the development of various policy at the Azerbaijan National Conservatory Association. These activities include football (US. Soccer), volleyball, basketball, youth patriotism clubs, and a charity-run association named after Uzeyir Hajibeyov.

The Department of International Relations 
The Department of International Relations allows for opportunities for connection between local and foreign students at the university. The Department additionally organizes various opportunities for the participation for the students in foreign training and consular projects.

The Department of Projects 
The Department of Projects crowdsources its projects and initiatives from the students' ideas, incentivizing a culture of students who want to build, create, become active, and realize their passions. The varying diversity of projects benefit the culture of the university and the broader local community.

The Department of Science and Education 
The Department of Science and Education aims to help the development of the students' intellectual abilities. The Department carries out various educational projects and organizes diverse training and scientific conferences and works in tandem with the Student Scientific Society, the Conversation Club, the Theater Club, and the Book Club(s), all of which, fall under the Science and Education Department umbrella.

See also 
Music of Azerbaijan

References 



Music schools in Azerbaijan
Educational institutions established in 2000